Stade Richter was a multi-purpose stadium in Montpellier, France. The stadium held 30,000 spectators and was preceded by the Parc des Sports de l'avenue du Pont Juvénal.

It was the home ground of the Montpellier, until their current stadium, Stade de la Mosson, opened in 1972.

Even after the Stade de la Mosson opened, the Stade Richter was used for concerts, by artists including Bruce Springsteen & The E Street Band (1985), U2 (1987), Pink Floyd (1988) & Michael Jackson (1988).

External links
 Stadium information
 Aerial picture

Defunct football venues in France
Buildings and structures in Montpellier
Sports venues in Montpellier
Sports venues completed in 1968